Cenophengus pallidus is a species of glowworm beetle in the family Phengodidae. It is found in North America.

References

Further reading

 

Phengodidae
Bioluminescent insects
Articles created by Qbugbot
Beetles described in 1904